Jamaat Zehi (also Romanized as Jamā‘at Zehī; also known as Jamā‘at Zā’ī, Jamā Zehī, Jammāzī, and Jommāzī) is a village in Polan Rural District, Polan District, Chabahar County, Sistan and Baluchestan Province, Iran. At the 2006 census, its population was 394, in 64 families.

References 

Populated places in Chabahar County